Martinstown is a townland in County Westmeath, Ireland.

Martinstown is one of 11 townlands of the civil parish of Stonehall in the barony of Corkaree in the Province of Leinster.

The neighbouring townlands are: Knockbody to the north, Farrancallin and Taghmon to the east, Sheefin to the south–east, Parsonstown to the south, Galmoylestown Upper to the south–west and Blackmiles to the north–west.

In the 1911 census of Ireland there were 11 houses and 57 inhabitants

in the townland.

References

External links
Map of Martinstown at openstreetmap.org
Martinstown at the IreAtlas Townland Data Base
Martinstown at Townlands.ie
Martinstown at The Placenames Database of Ireland

Townlands of County Westmeath